Jorge Herrera may refer to:

 Jorge Herrera (swimmer) (born 1972), Puerto Rican freestyle swimmer
 Jorge Herrera (footballer) (born 1982), Colombian footballer
 Jorge Herrera (musician) Ecuadorian lead vocalist for the American punk band The Casualties (1990-2017).
 Jorge Herrera Delgado (1961–2014), Mexican politician